Joan Benoit Samuelson (born May 16, 1957) is an American marathon runner who was the first women's Olympic Games marathon champion, winning the gold medal at the 1984 Summer Olympics in Los Angeles. She held the fastest time for an American woman at the Chicago Marathon for 32 years after winning the race in 1985. Her time at the Boston Marathon was the fastest time by an American woman at that race for 28 years. She was inducted into the Maine Women's Hall of Fame in 2000.

Competitive life and Boston Marathon victories
Born in Cape Elizabeth, Maine, Benoit took to long-distance running to help recover from a broken leg suffered while slalom skiing. At Bowdoin College she excelled in athletics. In 1977, after two years at Bowdoin, she accepted a running scholarship to North Carolina State, where she began concentrating solely on her running. She earned All-America honors at NC State in both 1977 and 1978, and in 1978 helped lead the Wolfpack to the Atlantic Coast Conference cross-country championship. She won the Broderick Award (now the Honda Sports Award) as the nation's best female collegiate cross country runner for 1979–80.

After returning to Bowdoin to complete her degree, she entered the 1979 Boston Marathon as a relative unknown. She won the race, wearing a Boston Red Sox cap, in 2:35:15, knocking eight minutes off the competition record. In 1981, she captured the U.S. 10,000 meter championship, posting a time of 33:37.50. Despite having surgery on her Achilles tendons two years earlier, she repeated her marathon success with a victory in 1983, setting a course record of 2:22:43. That took more than two minutes off the world's best time, set by Norway's Grete Waitz in the London Marathon only a day earlier. Her Boston record was not broken for another 11 years.

Olympic success and later life

In March 1984, Benoit injured her knee severely during a 20-mile training run, forcing her to undergo arthroscopic knee surgery just 17 days before the United States Olympic Women's Marathon Trials were scheduled. However, she recovered from the surgery much more quickly than expected, and was the favorite in the trials, at Olympia, Washington. She beat runner-up Julie Brown by 30 seconds, winning in 2:31:04. Three months later, she competed in the 1984 Summer Olympics in Los Angeles, winning the first Olympic Women's Marathon in 2:24:52, several hundred meters ahead of Grete Waitz, Rosa Mota, and Ingrid Kristiansen.

Benoit enjoyed success at non-marathon distances as well, winning the prestigious Falmouth Road Race (7.1 miles) a total of six times (1976, 1978, 1981–1983, and 1985), breaking the course record on four of those occasions.

Although she won the 1985 Chicago marathon, defeating Kristiansen and Mota in an American Record time of 2:21:21 (that would last as the AR for 18 years until broken by Deena Kastor in 2003 in London), Benoit was hampered for some years after her Olympic victory by injuries and struggled to compete in major races. She received the 1985 James E. Sullivan Award as the top amateur athlete in the United States.

Benoit wrote Running Tide (1987) and Running for Women (1995).

In 1998 she founded the Beach to Beacon 10K Road Race, a  race held in Cape Elizabeth, Maine, each August, going from Crescent Beach State Park to Fort Williams Park and Portland Head Light. The race attracts many of the world's top distance runners. Elite runners often run this race and then, the following weekend, run the Falmouth Road Race on Cape Cod, Massachusetts. Benoit won that race several times, and ran it last in 2022, finishing as the 69th woman overall and first in her age group.

In 2003, at age 46, Benoit won the Maine half-marathon, defeating a field dominated by runners two decades her junior, and she was faster than all but six men overall, finishing in 1:18. In 2006, she helped pace former cycling champion Lance Armstrong as he competed in the New York City Marathon. At the 2008 US Olympic Team trials, at the age of 50, she finished in 2:49:08, setting a new US 50+ record and beating her personal goal at the time of a mid-2:50s marathon. When she ran the New York City Marathon on November 1, 2009, she broke the Senior Masters record for runners older than 50 with a final time of 2:49:09. On October 10, 2010, she ran 2:47:50 for 43rd place at the Chicago Marathon—the site of her American record a quarter century earlier—missing her goal of qualifying for an eighth Olympic Marathon Team Trials race by 1:50, but recording the fastest-ever performance by a woman over 52. Later that month she ran in the Athens Classic Marathon for fun and finished in 3:02, the slowest time of her career; she was not fully healed from her Chicago performance. In April 2011, Joan competed in the Boston Marathon, completing the course in 2:51:29 and placing 1st in her age group. Between 2013 and 2015, Samuelson ran the Boston Marathon each year, and setting three of the four fastest marathon times for the 55-59 age group.  None are recognised by the World Masters Athletics since the Boston Marathon course does not comply with IAAF regulations.  Her times are 2:50:33 (2013), 2:52:15 (2014), and 2:54:26 (2015).  In 2019, Benoit ran the Boston Marathon again, forty years after her 1979 win. She had hoped to be within 40 minutes of her 1979 time, but did even better than that with a time of 3:04:00, within thirty minutes of her winning time, again winning her age group (60-64).

Winning the race four times, Benoit has run the Bix 7 road race in Davenport, Iowa, annually since 1983. A bronze statue of Benoit and Bill Rodgers was erected near the Bix finish line in 2007.

Benoit resides in Freeport, Maine, where the high school athletic complex is named the "Joan Benoit Samuelson Track and Field". In addition to her running, she currently serves as a coach to women's cross-country and long-distance athletes, and is a motivational speaker and sports commentator. She is featured on the Nike+ iPod system as one of the congratulatory voices. Benoit and husband Scott Samuelson have two children, daughter Abby and son Anders, who are runners in their own right, and shared the running of the 2014 Boston Marathon with their mother.

She was inducted into the National Distance Running Hall of Fame in 1998, the Maine Women's Hall of Fame in 2000, the National Track and Field Hall of Fame in 2004 and the USATF Masters Hall of Fame in 2014. In 2017, a plaque honoring her was unveiled in the L.A. Memorial Coliseum's Court of Honor.

In 2019, on the eve of the 40th anniversary of her first Boston Marathon win, Benoit and her daughter Abby ran together as they had done in previous marathons. Joan recorded a run time of 3:04:00, which was within 40 minutes of her original time which was a promise she had made prior to competing in this years edition of the Boston Marathon. This allowed her to win her age group (60-64) by nearly nine minutes, but falling short of the overall (3:01:30) fastest time by a woman over 60 in a marathon.

Notable marathoning achievements
All results regarding marathon, unless stated otherwise

AG = Samuelson is credited with winning her age group at the 2013 and 2019 Boston Marathon.  The 2013 race is the fastest marathon by a woman age 55–59 but is not recognised by World Masters Athletics because of IAAF regulations on a marathon course for a world record, which Boston is not recognised under regulations.

References

External links 
 
 
 
 

1957 births
Living people
People from Freeport, Maine
People from Cape Elizabeth, Maine
American female long-distance runners
American female marathon runners
Athletes (track and field) at the 1983 Pan American Games
Athletes (track and field) at the 1984 Summer Olympics
James E. Sullivan Award recipients
Olympic gold medalists for the United States in track and field
Bowdoin College alumni
Boston Marathon female winners
Chicago Marathon female winners
Medalists at the 1984 Summer Olympics
Pan American Games gold medalists for the United States
Pan American Games medalists in athletics (track and field)
Track and field athletes from Maine
Medalists at the 1983 Pan American Games
21st-century American women
20th-century American women
NC State Wolfpack women's track and field athletes
NC State Wolfpack women's cross country runners